Christopher Andrews may refer to:

 Christopher Columbus Andrews (1829–1922), American brigadier general
 Christopher Andrews (writer) (born 1970), American actor and writer; see Living Dead
Christopher Andrews (singer) (born 1942), English-German singer-songwriter
Christopher Andrews (editor) on Joey (1986 film)

See also
 Christopher Andrewes (1896–1988), British virologist
 Chris Andrews (disambiguation)
 Christopher Andrew (disambiguation)